The Hot Docs Award for Best Canadian Feature Documentary is an annual Canadian film award, presented by the Hot Docs Canadian International Documentary Festival to the film selected by jury members as the year's best Canadian feature film in the festival program. The award was presented for the first time in 1998; prior to that year, awards were presented in various genre categories, but no special distinction for Canadian films was presented. The award is sponsored by the Documentary Organization of Canada and Telefilm Canada, and carries a cash prize of $10,000.

In 2001, the festival presented both "gold" and "silver" medals in the category, although this structure was not retained in future years. 

In most years, the festival also presents a Special Jury Prize to a Canadian feature documentary which was not the primary winner of the main award, but still features some award-worthy aspect such as narrative or technical innovation. The Special Jury Prize is sponsored by the Directors Guild of Canada and its Ontario chapter, and carries a $5,000 cash prize.

Winners

Best Canadian Feature Documentary

Special Jury Prize

References

Canadian documentary film awards